Chateau La Coste is a 600-acre sculpture park, art destination and organic winery in Provence. The property includes Villa La Coste a luxury hotel. 
The sculpture park contains art and architecture by Tadao Ando, Louise Bourgeois, Bob Dylan, Tracey Emin, André Fu, Frank Gehry, Andy Goldsworthy, Christopher Green, Kengo Kuma, Paul Matisse, Oscar Niemeyer, Jean Nouvel, Renzo Piano, Richard Rogers, Richard Serra, Conrad Shawcross, Lee Ufan, Ai Weiwei and Franz West.
Irish property magnate Paddy McKillen is the estate owner and project manager of the hotel.
Wine varietals of the estate include Syrah, Cabernet Sauvignon and Vermentino.

See also
List of sculpture parks

References

Luxury hotels
Hotels in France
Châteaux in Provence-Alpes-Côte d'Azur
Sculpture exhibitions
Contemporary art exhibitions
Contemporary works of art
Installation art works
Sculpture gardens, trails and parks in France
Sculpture galleries in France
Steel sculptures